Ford Massif is a broad, snow-topped massif  long and  wide, forming the major topographic landmark of the northern Thiel Mountains in Antarctica. It was named by the Advisory Committee on Antarctic Names for geologist Arthur B. Ford of the United States Geological Survey (USGS). He was co-leader of the 1960–61 USGS Thiel Mountains survey party and leader of the 1961–62 geologic party to these mountains. Ford led geological parties working in the Pensacola Mountains in several austral seasons, 1962–63 to 1978–79.

See also
 Mountains in Antarctica
 Hadley Peak
 Streitenberger Cliff

References 

 

Mountains of Ellsworth Land